This is a list of bridges and crossings over the Niagara River in order from Lake Erie downstream (generally northward) to Lake Ontario.  Bridges and crossings marked * cross branches of the river within the United States, while those marked † cross within Canada.  All others cross the full river and connect the U.S. and Canada. The endpoints of each bridge or crossing are shown in order from right to left facing downstream.

See also
 
 
 
 

Niagara River
Niagara River
Crossings